Mick Burns (1937 – 22 February 2023) was an Irish hurler who played for his local club Nenagh Éire Óg and was a member of the Tipperary senior inter-county team in the 1950s and 1960s.

Career
Burns was born in Nenagh, County Tipperary. He won five All-Ireland titles and eight Munster titles with Tipperary between 1958 and 1968. He won two North Tipperary Senior Hurling Championships with Éire Óg in 1957 and as captain in 1964.

Death
Burns died on 22 February 2023, at the age of 85.

Honours
Tipperary
All-Ireland Senior Hurling Championship (5): 1958, 1961, 1962, 1964, 1965
Munster Senior Hurling Championship (8): 1958, 1960, 1961, 1962, 1964, 1965, 1967, 1968
National Hurling League (6):  1958–59, 1959–60, 1960–61, 1963–64, 1964–65, 1967–68
Oireachtas Cup (4): 1960, 1961, 1963, 1964
All-Ireland Minor Hurling Championship (1): 1955
Munster Minor Hurling Championship (2): 1954, 1955

Munster 
Railway Cup (1): 1963

Nenagh Éire Óg
North Tipperary Senior Hurling Championship (2): 1957, 1964 (c)
North Tipperary Minor A Hurling Championship (3): 1951, 1953, 1955

References

1937 births
2023 deaths
Nenagh Éire Óg hurlers
Tipperary inter-county hurlers
Munster inter-provincial hurlers
All-Ireland Senior Hurling Championship winners